Khungdongbam Krishananda Singh (born 1 February 1996) is an Indian professional footballer who plays as a winger for I-League club RoundGlass Punjab.

Career

TRAU
Singh started his career with I-League 2nd Division side TRAU in 2018.

Gokulam Kerala FC
On 25 June 2021, it was announced that Singh signed for Gokulam Kerala in the I-League.

Career statistics

Club

Honours
TRAU
 I-League 2nd Division: 2018–19

References

Living people
1996 births
People from Thoubal district
Footballers from Manipur
Indian footballers
Association football midfielders
Gokulam Kerala FC players
TRAU FC players
I-League players